A Time For Lions is an album by Stars of Track and Field. It was released September 1, 2009 on iTunes and September 15, 2009 physically by Wind-Up Records.

Track listing
All tracks by Kevin Calaba & Jason Bell

 "Racing Lights" – 3:20
 "End of All Time" – 3:36
 "The Breaking of Waves" – 3:28
 "Now You Lift Your Eyes to the Sun" – 4:26
 "In Bright Fire" – 3:36
 "Peeling Away" – 3:19
 "Through the Static" – 3:20
 "Safety in Numbers" – 3:32
 "The Aviator" – 3:27
 "The Stranger" – 4:50
 "Sunrise Ends" – 3:29

Personnel 

John Allcastro – engineer
Jason Bell – producer, engineer
Jason Bell – engineer
Kevin Calaba – producer, engineer
Daphne Chen – violin, viola
Mathew Cooker – cello
Victor Florencia – mixing
Scott Hull – mastering
Mike Kahn – A&R
John King – producer
Tawnee Lillo – French horn
Darren Majewski – A&R
Diana Meltzer – A&R
Brian Montgomery – engineer
Roger Neill – string arrangements, brass arrangement
Ross Petersen – producer, engineer
Todd Sickafoose – bass, double bass
John Spiker – bass
Gregg Wattenberg – producer, supervisor, A&R
Josh Wilbur – engineer

2009 albums
Stars of Track and Field albums
Wind-up Records albums
Albums produced by John King (record producer)